The 1974 Cornell Big Red football team was an American football team that represented Cornell University during the 1974 NCAA Division I football season. Cornell finished second-to-last in the Ivy League. 

In its ninth and final season under head coach Jack Musick, the team compiled a 3–5–1 record and was outscored 193 to 183. Rick Johnson and Dan Malone were the team captains. 

Cornell's 1–5–1 conference record placed seventh in the Ivy League standings. The Big Red was outscored 172 to 119 by Ivy opponents. 

Cornell played its home games at Schoellkopf Field in Ithaca, New York.

Schedule

References

Cornell
Cornell Big Red football seasons
Cornell Big Red football